Movies.com was a website; the URL now redirects to that of its owner, Fandango Media.

It was acquired from The Walt Disney Company in June 2008.

The site was home to the award-winning webshow Statler and Waldorf: From the Balcony, a bi-weekly movie preview webcast starring the Muppets. Another webshow featured late Brandon Schantz and a movie spoof called The DiCaprio Code, parodying The Da Vinci Code.

References

American film websites
Fandango
Former subsidiaries of The Walt Disney Company